Melanine may refer to:
"Melanine", a song from the album Dive by Tycho.
Melanin, a natural pigment (spelled as melanine in French and Dutch)

See also 
 Melamine, an organic compound
Melamine resin, a plastic material made from melamine and formaldehyde